Chapters of the manga series  written by Kōji Kumeta was first serialized in the Japanese manga magazine Weekly Shōnen Magazine in 2005, published by Kodansha. It is a comedy about a teacher who takes all aspects of life, word and culture in the most negative light possible. It satirizes politics, media, and Japanese society. In 2007, the manga received the thirty-first Kodansha Manga Award in the shōnen category.

Thirty tankōbon volumes have been released in Japan. The series has been licensed for an English-language translation by Del Rey Manga, and the first volume was released in February 2009. As of April 2012, Del Rey and Kodansha Comics have released fourteen volumes in North America. Chapter 268 was not included in the bound volume collection of the manga, as it caused controversy due to similarities between its plot and a story in the 13th volume of Doraemon.



Volume list

Chapter not in tankōbon format
In the paper blog of volume 27, the author has stated that he suppressed the inclusion of chapter 268 even though permission was granted by Doraemon's author, Fujiko Fujio and its publisher, Shogakukan.
268.

References

External links

 Manga official website 

Sayonara, Zetsubou-Sensei
Kōji Kumeta